Elie Ferzli (born 22 November 1949 in Zahle, Lebanon) is a Lebanese and Eastern Orthodox Christian politician. He served as Information Minister and Deputy Speaker of the Parliament of Lebanon in the early 2000s. He was succeeded by as deputy speaker Farid Makari in 2005. He expressed pro-Syrian sentiments during the Cedar Revolution. In 2018, he was reelected to parliament, and took again the seat of Deputy Speaker of the Parliament of Lebanon. In 2021, he skipped the line for vaccinations against COVID-19, taking the vaccine despite not being in neither the correct age group nor the correct risk group. In May 2022, he lost his parliamentary seat despite several attempts at manipulating the results.

References

External links

1949 births
Eastern Orthodox Christians from Lebanon
Information ministers of Lebanon
Lebanese University alumni
Living people
Members of the Parliament of Lebanon
People from Zahle